Flats is an extinct town in McPherson County, Nebraska, United States. The GNIS classifies it as a populated place.

History
A post office was established at Flats in 1919, and remained in operation until it was discontinued in 1972. Flats derives its name from Lombard Flats, an early farm in the area.

References

Unincorporated communities in McPherson County, Nebraska
Unincorporated communities in Nebraska